The 1913 Ohio Green and White football team represented Ohio University as a member of the Ohio Athletic Conference (OAC) during the 1913 college football season. Led by first-year head coach M. B. Banks, the Green and White compiled an overall record of 2–5–1 with a mark of 1–3 in conference play, placing tenth in the OAC.

Schedule

References

Ohio
Ohio Bobcats football seasons
Ohio Green and White football